Hans Diethelm (born 18 July 1967) is a Swiss cross-country skier who competed from 1992 to 1997. Competing in two Winter Olympics, he earned his best individual finish of seventh in the 4 × 10 km relay at Lillehammer in 1994 and had his best individual finish of 30th twice (50 km: 1992, 10 km + 15 km combined pursuit: 1994).

Diethelm's best finish at the FIS Nordic World Ski Championships was 27th in the 10 km event at Falun in 1993. His best World Cup finish was 17th in an individual sprint event in Germany in 1996.

Diethelm's best individual career finish was second in a 15 km FIS Race in Switzerland in 1995.

World Cup results
All results are sourced from the International Ski Federation (FIS).

World Cup standings

References

External links

Olympic 4 x 10 km relay results: 1936-2002 

1967 births
Cross-country skiers at the 1992 Winter Olympics
Cross-country skiers at the 1994 Winter Olympics
Living people
Swiss male cross-country skiers
Olympic cross-country skiers of Switzerland